A dirty bomb is a speculative radiological weapon.

Dirty Bomb may also refer to:

 Dirty Bomb (video game), a video game developed by Splash Damage
 Dirty Bomb (album), an album by KGC
 Dirty Bomb (film), a Finnish film